The Slovakian Association for Dynamic Shooting, Slovak Slovenskej Asociácie Dynamickej Streľby (SADS), is the Slovak association for practical shooting under the International Practical Shooting Confederation.

External links 
 Official homepage of SADS

References 

Regions of the International Practical Shooting Confederation
Practical Shooting